Gateway Church may refer to:
Gateway Church (Texas), a non-denominational Charismatic Christian megachurch in Southlake, Texas, United States
Gateway Community Church, a diversified denomination church in Baguio City, Philippines 
Gateway Church, Leeds, an Evangelical church in Leeds, West Yorkshire, England